Chantal Langanay (born 11 April 1944) is a French former professional tennis player.

Langanay, a native of Rouen, is the daughter of 1930s tennis player Jacques Langanay. She was the French junior champion in 1958, beating Françoise Durr in the final. During the 1960s she was a regular in the singles main draw of the French Championships and never progressed further than the second round.

References

External links
 

1944 births
Living people
French female tennis players
Sportspeople from Rouen